Vĩnh Long Airfield (also known as Vĩnh Long Army Airfield, Gauvin-Upton Airfield or Shannon-Wright Compound) is a former United States Army base west of Vĩnh Long in Vĩnh Long Province, Mekong Delta, Vietnam.

History

The base was originally established in 1963 approximately 3 km west of Vĩnh Long and 48 km southwest of Mỹ Tho. The base was named after Captain Roger Gauvin and SP5 Carleton Upton of the 114th Aviation Company who were killed in action on 15 March 1964.

The base was attacked by Vietcong forces as part of the Tet Offensive on 31 January 1968 resulting in 7 U.S. killed and 3 Bell UH-1 Iroquois helicopters destroyed.

The 2nd Brigade, 9th Infantry Division comprising:
3rd Battalion, 47th Infantry
4th Battalion, 47th Infantry
was based here from April–May 1968.

Other units stationed at Vĩnh Long at various times included:
7th Squadron, 1st Cavalry Regiment (June 1968-April 1972)
62nd Aviation Company (October–December 1964)
114th Assault Helicopter Company (May 1963-February 1972)
175th Assault Helicopter Company (September 1966-February 1972)
199th Assault Helicopter Company (July 1967-October 1970)
502nd Aviation Battalion (December 1964-September 1966)
HA(L)-3 Detachment 3 (January 1968)
28th and 96th Avionics Signal Detachment
 A Company, 501st Aviation Battalion arrived during December 1964

Current use
The base is abandoned but still clearly visible on satellite images.

Accidents and incidents
On 18 December 1970 two OH-6 Cayuse light observation helicopters collided shortly after takeoff and crashed destroying both and killing all four crewmen

References

External links
 Modern photos and video of the area

Installations of the United States Army in South Vietnam
Defunct airports in Vietnam
Buildings and structures in Vĩnh Long province